Cleopatra guillemei is a species of freshwater snails with an operculum, aquatic gastropod molluscs in the family Paludomidae.

This species is found in Burundi, Kenya, Tanzania, and possibly Uganda. Its natural habitats are rivers and swamps.

References

Paludomidae
Invertebrates of Burundi
Molluscs of Kenya
Invertebrates of Tanzania
Freshwater snails of Africa
Gastropods described in 1885
Taxonomy articles created by Polbot